Susan Yvonne Illston (born June 24, 1948) is a Senior United States district judge of the United States District Court for the Northern District of California. She was nominated by President Bill Clinton and confirmed by the Senate in 1995. She took senior status in 2013.

Education and career

Illston was born in Tokyo, Japan, was raised in the military and attended Fort Knox High School. She graduated Duke University, receiving a Bachelor of Arts in 1970 and she received a Juris Doctor from Stanford Law School in 1973. Prior to her appointment, Illston served in private practice first as an associate, then as a partner at Cotchett, Illston & Pitre in Burlingame, California from 1973 to 1995.

Federal judicial service

On the recommendations of Senators Barbara Boxer and Dianne Feinstein, Illston was nominated by President Bill Clinton on January 23, 1995 and confirmed by the Senate on May 25, 1995 by voice vote, receiving her commission the following day. She took senior status on July 1, 2013.

Notable cases

DiLoreto v. Downey
Sitting by designation of the Ninth Circuit Court of Appeals, in 1999 Judge Illston wrote the panel decision in DiLoreto v. Downey Unified School District Board of Education, 196 F.3d 958 (9th Cir. 1999), cert. denied, 529 U.S. 1067 (2000), which held that an athletic fence which a public high school made available for commercial advertising is a nonpublic forum from which religious messages could be excluded without violating the First Amendment.

321 Studios v. Metro Goldwyn Mayer Studios, Inc.
In February 2004, Illston ruled in 321 Studios v. Metro Goldwyn Mayer Studios, Inc. that the company's software, which was intended, according to the company, to allow consumers to make backup copies of DVDs by "circumventing" so-called "copy protection" methods, was illegal under Federal law.  She issued an injunction at the behest of several Hollywood studios and ordered 321 Studios to stop selling their product. However, despite finding that the software violated Federal law, she ruled that copies made by consumers (of their own legally purchased DVDs) were, in fact, legal. She wrote in her opinion, "It is the technology itself at issue, not the uses to which the copyrighted material may be put...Legal downstream use of the copyrighted material by customers is not a defense to the software manufacturer's violation of the provisions [of copyright law]."

US v. Arnold
In August 2006, Illston sentenced Patrick Arnold, a chemist who developed an undetectable performance-enhancing drug for BALCO, to three months in prison.

US v. Bonds
In March 2009, Illston presided over a perjury case involving Barry Bonds.

Kyriacou v. Peralta Community College Dist.
In April 2009, Illston ruled that two students who were threatened with suspension by their community college, the College of Alameda, could sue the school for free speech infringement.

Center for Biological Diversity v. Bureau of Land Management
In October 2009, Illston ruled in favor of environmental groups, including the Center for Biological Diversity, that sued the U.S. Bureau of Land Management (BLM) over a 5,000 mile expansion of off-roading trails in California's Mojave Desert. Illston found that the BLM had violated its own regulations when it designated the routes in 2006 without adequately analyzing the impacts on air quality, soils, plant communities and sensitive species such as the endangered Mojave fringe-toed lizard. Illston called the BLM's plan "flawed because it does not contain a reasonable range of alternatives" to limit damage to sensitive habitat and pointed out that the desert and its resources are "extremely fragile, easily scarred, and slowly healed." The court also found that the BLM had failed to follow route restrictions established in the agency’s own conservation plan, resulting in the establishment of hundreds of illegal off roading routes during the past three decades. Illston ruled that the plan specifically violated the Federal Land Policy and Management Act of 1976 (FLPMA) and the National Environmental Policy Act of 1969 (NEPA).

Kitterman v. Thomas
Illston issued a published order filed November 21, 2016 under case number KITTERMAN KITTERMAN v. THOMAS Case No. 16-cv-04058-SI.

Sony v. Hotz
Illston in 2011 was the presiding judge in Sony Computer Entertainment America LLC v. George Hotz, et al., in which Sony claims that Hotz's jailbreaking of the Sony PlayStation 3 violates the Digital Millennium Copyright Act.  She has granted Sony permission to track as much information as possible about those who had seen a private YouTube video about the jailbreak and to read their comments, plus obtain access to IP addresses, accounts, and other details of visitors to sites run by Geohot.  The access granted by Illston extends even to those who had not downloaded the jailbreak code.

In Re: National Security Letters
In a March 15, 2013, ruling Judge Illston granted petitioner's motion to set aside a National Security Letter (NSL), ruling that the NSL's nondisclosure and judicial review provisions suffer from significant Constitutional infirmities. The petitioner argued that the nondisclosure provision of statute 18 U.S.C. § 2709(c) is an unconstitutional prior restraint and content-based restriction on speech. The decision came in a lawsuit challenging a NSL on behalf of an unnamed telecommunications company represented by the Electronic Frontier Foundation (EFF). The judge stayed her decision for 90 days to give the government the opportunity to appeal.

Pirani v. Slack Technologies, Inc.
in April 2020, Judge Illston issued an order partially granting Slack Technologies’ motion to dismiss a class action complaint against it. But the judge in a matter of first impression held that the plaintiff did not lack standing to pursue claims under Section 11 of the Securities Act, in the unique situation of a direct listing in which shares registered under the Securities Act become publicly tradeable on the same day that unregistered shares become publicly tradeable, even though the plaintiff could not show that her shares were registered.

Publications
California Complex Litigation Manual (1990)
Insurance Coverage in a Toxic Tort Case, A Guide to Toxic Torts (1987)

References

External links

Judge Illston's webpage at the United States District Court for the Northern District of California
Illston Profile on Judgepedia

1948 births
Living people
Lawyers from San Francisco
People from Burlingame, California
People from Tokyo
Duke University alumni
Stanford Law School alumni
Drugs in sport in the United States
Judges of the United States District Court for the Northern District of California
United States district court judges appointed by Bill Clinton
20th-century American judges
21st-century American judges
20th-century American women judges
21st-century American women judges